Brendan Albert Moore (born April 16, 1992) is an American soccer player. Moore is also a distinguished amateur tennis player. In December 2022, Moore captained his ALTA team to a C-4 Men's division title.

Youth and college

Youth and college 
Moore attended Centennial High School in Georgia, where he help lead the team to the AAAAA state championship match in 2009. Moore played college soccer at University of North Carolina from 2010 to 2014.

Professional career 
From 2015 through 2017, Moore spent time with Fleetwood Town and Torquay United in the English league system.

Rochdale
In July 2017, Moore moved to EFL League One club Rochdale. He made his league debut for the club on August 19, 2017 in a 3-2 away loss to Shrewsbury Town.

Atlanta United
On January 9, 2019, MLS side Atlanta United announced the signing of Moore as a Discovery Signing.

Following the 2020 season, Moore was released by Atlanta on November 24, 2020.

Career statistics

Club

References

External links

1992 births
Living people
American expatriate soccer players
American soccer players
Association football goalkeepers
Atlanta United FC players
English Football League players
Fleetwood Town F.C. players
National League (English football) players
People from Roswell, Georgia
Rochdale A.F.C. players
Soccer players from Georgia (U.S. state)
Sportspeople from Fulton County, Georgia
Torquay United F.C. players
Atlanta United 2 players
USL Championship players
Expatriate footballers in England
American expatriate sportspeople in England
Mississippi Brilla players
Orlando City U-23 players